Colaspidema is a genus of leaf beetles in the subfamily Chrysomelinae.

Species
The genus contains the following species, in two subgenera:
 Subgenus Colaphomega Reitter, 1913 (Type species: Chrysomela rufifrons Olivier, 1807)
 Colaspidema dufouri (Perez Arcas, 1865)
 Colaspidema rufifrons (Olivier, 1807)
 Colaspidema signatipenne Guérin-Ménéville, 1844
 Subgenus Colaspidema Laporte, 1833 (Type species: Chrysomela atra Olivier, 1790 (= Chrysomela barbara Fabricius, 1792))
 Colaspidema barbarum (Fabricius, 1792)

References

Chrysomelidae genera
Chrysomelinae
Taxa named by François-Louis Laporte, comte de Castelnau